Janka Boga Dénesné (31 January 1886 – 4 October 1963) was a Hungarian writer and teacher.

Born in Gyergyóújfalu (now Suseni, Romania) in 1886, Boga worked as a teacher in Kecskemét and retired in 1952. In 1920, she started publishing her writings in several local publications, and Szeged was the place for the first performances of her theatre plays.

Works
Vezeklés (Kecskemét, 1930)
Légy az élettársam (Bp., 1934)
Él-e még a jóság? (Kecskemét, 1948)

References

1886 births
1963 deaths
Hungarian schoolteachers
Hungarian women dramatists and playwrights
People from Harghita County
20th-century Hungarian dramatists and playwrights
20th-century Hungarian women writers